Frederick Bennett Balzar (June 15, 1880 – March 21, 1934) was an American politician and lawyer. He was the 15th Governor of Nevada. He was a member of the Republican Party.

Biography
Balzar was born in Virginia City, Nevada. His attended school in Nevada, and graduated from San Francisco Polytechnic High School. Balzar worked at a variety of occupations, including stagecoach driving, ranching, railroading, mining, and insurance.

A Republican, he served in the Nevada Assembly from 1905 to 1906, and the Nevada Senate from 1909 to 1916,.  He was sheriff and county assessor of Mineral County from 1917 to 1926, and chairman of the Nevada Republican Party from 1924 to 1925.

Balzar won the race for governor in 1926, defeating incumbent James G. Scrugham. After a lengthy illness Balzar died in the governor's mansion on March 21, 1934, in Carson City, Nevada. In 1931, he signed into law Assembly Bill 98, which allowed for wide-open gambling in Nevada.

Balzar died in office at the Nevada Governor's Mansion. He shared a close friendship with comedian Will Rogers, who eulogized him as "a real two-fisted governor."

References

External links
 
Biography, Fred B. Balzar at National Governors Association

1880 births
1934 deaths
American Christian Scientists
Republican Party governors of Nevada
Republican Party Nevada state senators
Republican Party members of the Nevada Assembly
People from Virginia City, Nevada
20th-century American politicians